A magot is a seated oriental figurine, usually of porcelain or ivory, of a grotesque form; the name derives from the Barbary ape, also known as "magot".

References

Figurines
Iconography
Decorative arts